Parklands United Sports Club is a football club in Christchurch, New Zealand.

History 
Parklands United was first formed as North Beach Soccer Club in 1967. It was initially formed with the goal of playing social Sunday soccer against hotels and business houses in and around Christchurch. Former coach and administrator Gordon Patterson was one of those that helped run the club from its small hall on Beach Road in New Brighton, Christchurch, New Zealand. It attracted numerous players from the Parklands/Queenspark and New Brighton area and went on to grow and develop into a large size club by the mid-1990s, when the club changed its name to Parklands United in 1996. It was then that the clubhouse moved to its present location in Queenspark, Parklands, Christchurch, New Zealand.

Parklands made a brief appearance in South Island Division One North in 1996, reaching a club high 8th place in 1997 before falling back into division Two.
The men currently play in the Canterbury Championship League, while the women's team play in the Canterbury Womens Championship.

Colours and badge 

The club's colours are black and yellow.

Notable Club officials
 Coach: Gordon Patterson

Records
 League victory: 6-0 vs. Ashburton, 1998
 League defeat: 1-7 vs. Northern Hearts, 1998
 Cup Win: 2-1 vs. Waimakariri United, 2015
 Cup Loss: 0-11 vs. Halswell United, 1988
 National League placing: 7th, 1997; Southern League Division One North

References

External links
Official website
NZ Clubs Database
New Zealand 2004/05 Season Results

Association football clubs in Christchurch
Association football clubs established in 1983
1983 establishments in New Zealand